Euastacus setosus is a species of southern crawfish in the family Parastacidae.

The IUCN conservation status of Euastacus setosus is "CR", critically endangered. The species faces an extremely high risk of extinction in the immediate future. The IUCN status was reviewed in 2010.  The species is found is only one place, a creek system near Mount Glorious in the D'Aguilar Range of South East Queensland, Australia.

References

Further reading

 
 

Euastacus
Articles created by Qbugbot
Crustaceans described in 1956